Hasibe is a Turkish female given name. Notable people with the name include:

 Hasibe Çerko (born 1971), Turkish author
 Hasibe Eren (born 1975), Turkish actress
 Hasibe Erkoç (living), Turkish boxer

Turkish feminine given names